Spring Gap may refer to:

Spring Gap, Maryland, an unincorporated community in Allegany County
Spring Gap Mountain in the Eastern Panhandle of West Virginia
Spring Gap (Wyoming), a mountain pass in Wyoming